Noise Won't Stop is the third studio album by New York City electronica duo Shy Child.

Release
The album was the first by the band to be released in the UK, leading many to erroneously believe that it was the band's first album. The album was also released in the US and Japan.

Track listing
 "Drop the Phone" - 3:03
 "Pressure to Come" - 3:26
 "Kick Drum (Featuring Spank Rock)" - 3:23
 "The Volume" - 3:07
 "Generation Y (We Got It)" - 3:08
 "Astronaut" - 3:29
 "Good and Evil" - 3:23
 "Noise Won't Stop" - 3:21
 "Summer" - 3:47
 "What's It Feel Like?" - 5:00
 "Cause and Effect" - 5:09

Tracks 8 and 9 appeared on the band's previous album, One with the Sun.
Tracks 1 and 6 feature Saxophone by Seth Misterka.

Critical reception

Reviews of the album have been generally positive. Pitchfork Media gave the album 8/10, stating "it's when Shy Child's grip on songcraft grows extremely tenuous that their music becomes interesting, even thrilling". Drowned in Sound expressed similar praise: "And that’s the irony, y’see: the noise did stop. But, by god, you wish it hadn’t."

2007 albums
Shy Child albums